Sphinctacanthus is a genus of flowering plants in the family Acanthaceae, native to Myanmar and Sumatra. Poorly attested, it seems to be found in tropical evergreen forests.

Species
Currently accepted species include:
Sphinctacanthus parkinsonii C.E.C.Fisch.
Sphinctacanthus viridiflorus Ridl.

References

Acanthaceae genera
Acanthaceae